Ziridava gemmata is a moth in the family Geometridae. It is found on the Solomon Islands and the Bismarck Archipelago.

References

Moths described in 1899
Eupitheciini